The Bobby Smith Trophy is awarded annually to the Ontario Hockey League Scholastic Player of the Year, who best combines high standards of play and academic excellence. The trophy is named for Bobby Smith, a former Ottawa 67's player. It is symbolic of the high standard of excellence that Smith displayed on the ice, as well as in the classroom, during his outstanding junior career. Each team's nominee for the award becomes a member of the OHL Scholastic Team of the Year. The award is selected by a committee of OHL educational consultants, and by the director of NHLCentral Scouting. Each recipient is nominated for the CHL Scholastic Player of the Year award.

Winners
List of recipients of the Bobby Smith Trophy.
Blue background denotes also named CHL Scholastic Player of the Year

See also
 Marcel Robert Trophy – Quebec Major Junior Hockey League Scholastic Player of the Year
 Daryl K. (Doc) Seaman Trophy – Western Hockey League Scholastic Player of the Year
 List of Canadian Hockey League awards

References

External links
 Ontario Hockey League

Ontario Hockey League trophies and awards
Awards established in 1980